Kimberley Bret Greist (born May 12, 1958) is a retired American actress and model, best known for her roles in films throughout the 1980s and 1990s.

Biography
Greist was born in Stamford, Connecticut, the daughter of Norma M. (née Abtey) and Edwards Harold Greist, Jr.

Career
Greist trained for the stage and spent some of her late teenage years as a professional model in Europe.

She then returned to the United States at age 20 and launched her acting career in the off-Broadway comedy Second Prize: Two Months in Leningrad in 1983.
Her later stage credits included appearances in the New York Shakespeare Festival.

Greist's first film appearance was in the horror film C.H.U.D. (1984). In 1985, she made a guest appearance in the 1985 Miami Vice episode "Nobody Lives Forever" (S01E21) and also appeared in the film Brazil (1985).

Other films in which she appeared during the 1980s included Michael Mann's Manhunter (1986), Throw Momma from the Train (1987), and Punchline (1988). She continued to appear in films and television into the 1990s, with roles in Homeward Bound: The Incredible Journey (1993) and Roswell (1994). She played Emily Young opposite comedians Sinbad and Phil Hartman in the film Houseguest (1995). She also appeared in a number of made-for-television films.
In 2001, after appearing on an episode of Judging Amy called "The Last Word", Greist retired from acting.  

Greist currently resides in her hometown of Stamford, Connecticut.

Filmography

Film

Television

References

External links

1958 births
20th-century American actresses
21st-century American actresses
Actresses from Stamford, Connecticut
American film actresses
American television actresses
Living people